Garin Beare is a former Zimbabwe international lawn and indoor bowler.

He won a bronze medal in the singles at the 1988 World Outdoor Bowls Championship in Auckland.

References

Living people
1939 births
Sportspeople from Maputo
Bowls players at the 1982 Commonwealth Games
Bowls players at the 1990 Commonwealth Games
Bowls players at the 1994 Commonwealth Games
Commonwealth Games competitors for Zimbabwe
Zimbabwean male bowls players